Antonio Palminha (born 15 April 1963 in Sines) is a Portuguese sport shooter. He competed at the 1992 Summer Olympics in the mixed trap event, in which he tied for eleventh place.

References

1963 births
Living people
People from Sines
Trap and double trap shooters
Portuguese male sport shooters
Shooters at the 1992 Summer Olympics
Olympic shooters of Portugal
Sportspeople from Setúbal District